

References

See also
Conservation in Uganda
Central Forest Reserves of Uganda
List of national parks in Africa

References
Kibale Travel Guide

 List
Protected Areas
Uganda
Protected Areas